The Memorial to the Women of the Confederacy, also known as the U.D.C. Memorial Building, is a historic building located in Richmond, Virginia, that serves as the national headquarters of the United Daughters of the Confederacy. It was listed on the U.S. National Register of Historic Places in 2008. The building is open to the public on scheduled days.

History
The Memorial to the Women of the Confederacy is located at 328 North Arthur Ashe Boulevard, on the site of an old soldiers' home for veterans of the military forces of the Confederate States. The Park was created in 1934 by an act of the Assembly of Virginia. It was built between 1955 and 1957, and is a one-story, three part, marble-clad building in a stripped classical style.  It features a double leaf, central entrance designed to resemble a mausoleum and with 17-foot high bronze doors composed of rectangular bronze panels. A two-story addition was made to the rear of the northwest corner of the building in 1996. It was constructed principally of Georgia marble, with entrance doors of architectural bronze decorated with the organization's badge. The walks are of red Virginia brick. There are also memorials to Confederate heroes, to the women of the Confederacy, the co-founders of the organization, and a number of items from the camp of Robert E. Lee, a general in the Confederate States Army.

2020 fire 

The building was set on fire at about 1:30 am on May 30, 2020, during the George Floyd protests in Richmond, Virginia, following the murder of George Floyd. Reports from the fire department indicated that damage was limited to the headquarters' façade. Windows were broken and fire was set to the curtains hanging in the building's Caroline Meriwether Goodlett Library. Flames covered most of the front of the building. Nine fire trucks responded and the firefighters were able to extinguish the fire. A police line three blocks long protected the firefighting operation. The fire was largely contained to the library, but there was extensive smoke and water damage throughout the building and charring on the building's Georgia marble façade. Staff reported that all the books in the building's library had incurred some damage and that library shelving had been destroyed.

See also

 Confederate monuments
 Confederate Women's Monument, Baltimore
 Creole marble
 Ladies' Memorial Association
 List of monuments and memorials removed during the George Floyd protests
 National Register of Historic Places listings in Richmond, Virginia
 Neoclassical architecture

Notes

References

External links

1957 establishments in Virginia
Buildings and structures in Richmond, Virginia
Clubhouses on the National Register of Historic Places in Virginia
History of women in the United States
Libraries in Virginia
Monuments and memorials to women
National Register of Historic Places in Richmond, Virginia
Neoclassical architecture in Virginia
Office buildings completed in 1957
Office buildings in Virginia
Stripped Classical architecture in the United States
Tourist attractions in Richmond, Virginia
United Daughters of the Confederacy monuments and memorials
Confederate States of America monuments and memorials in Virginia